Cologne: From the Diary of Ray and Esther is a 1939 short documentary film which deals with the German-American community on the eve of World War II. It was filmed and directed by amateur filmmakers Esther Dowidat and Raymond Dowidat, residents of Cologne, Minnesota.

In 2001, this fourteen-minute film was selected for preservation in the United States National Film Registry by the Library of Congress as being "culturally, historically or aesthetically significant".

References

External links 
 
Cologne: From the Diary of Ray and Esther essay by Scott Simmon at National Film Registry
Cologne: From the Diary of Ray and Esther essay by Daniel Eagan in America's Film Legacy: The Authoritative Guide to the Landmark Movies in the National Film Registry, A&C Black, 2010 , pages 299-300 

 allplaidout.com: Cologne: From the Diary of Ray & Esther

1930s short documentary films
American short documentary films
United States National Film Registry films
American black-and-white films
Black-and-white documentary films
German-American history
Films shot in Minnesota
Works about German-American culture
1939 documentary films
1939 films
1930s American films